A cullishigay is an obsolete unit of dry volume used on the Malabar coast of southern India approximately equal to 1.25 imperial bushels (44 litres). It was a third of a mudi or moray, a larger unit of dry volume. After metrification in the mid-20th century, the unit became obsolete.

See also
List of customary units of measurement in South Asia

References

Units of volume
Customary units in India
Obsolete units of measurement